Wei County may refer to the following locations in China:

Wei County, Handan, Hebei
Wei County, Xingtai, Hebei
Weifang, formerly 
Weixian Internment Camp

County name disambiguation pages